April Wine is a Canadian rock band formed in 1969 and based in Halifax, Nova Scotia. Led by singer-guitarist-songwriter Myles Goodwin since its inception, April Wine first experienced success with their second album, On Record (1972), which reached the top 40 in Canada and yielded two hit singles: "Bad Side of the Moon", a top 20 hit in Canada; and "You Could Have Been a Lady", a number 2 song in Canada.

They have experienced little international success, with most success being limited to their home country of Canada, although they would go on to experience some international success throughout the 1970s and early '80s with songs such as "Weeping Widow" (1973), "I'm On Fire for You Baby" (1974), "Tonite Is a Wonderful Time to Fall in Love", (1975) "Roller", (1979), "I Like to Rock" (1980), "Sign of the Gypsy Queen". (1981), and "Just Between You and Me" (1981). They have released more than 20 studio albums.

History

Early years 
Although April Wine officially began in late 1969 in Waverley, Nova Scotia, their roots can be traced to St. John's, Newfoundland and Labrador, in 1967/68, where brothers David and Ritchie Henman grew up playing music together before moving to Nova Scotia.

Three of the founding members - David Henman (guitar), Ritchie Henman (drums), and their cousin Jim Henman (bass) - were originally in a band named Prism (not the famous one). After a brief break to attend university, the trio reformed with Myles Goodwyn on lead vocals and guitar. Goodwyn had previously played with Jim Henman in a group called the Termites. David Henman christened the new group "April Wine". They realized that Halifax did not provide opportunities to play and record, so they sent a demo tape to Aquarius Records in Montreal. Aquarius managers Terry Flood and Donald K. Tarlton returned a rejection letter but the band mistook it for an invitation. On April 1, 1970, April Wine went to Montreal, bringing with them their instruments and $100 in cash; Flood and Tarlton were persuaded to sign the band to a contract. They were set up in a chalet and booked at a local comedy club, Café Andre. They spent the next five months touring eastern Canada with Mashmakhan.

The band recorded and released their self-titled debut album April Wine in September 1971. The album included a single, "Fast Train", which was a top 40 hit in Canada and peaked at #38 on the RPM Singles Chart. It established Miles Goodwyn as April Wine's main songwriter. The album did not sell well, but the success of the single led the band's label to ask for a second album. Jim Henman left the band in the fall of 1971 and was replaced by Jim Clench. In the meantime, the band spent 1971 touring the college circuit, with the exception of July 30th, when they opened at Montreal's Place Des Nations for The Guess Who. 1972 was much the same, although they began to play larger venues and opened for a few more large acts, like Ike & Tina Turner, Jethro Tull, Badfinger and Stevie Wonder.

Mainstream success 
Under the guidance of producer Ralph Murphy, April Wine recorded their second album, On Record in 1972. The first single was a cover version of the Hot Chocolate song "You Could Have Been a Lady". The record was a commercial success, hitting number two for a single week on the RPM Canadian charts, as well as cracking the Billboard Hot 100 chart in the United States where it stayed for 11 weeks, peaking at No. 32. A second single, a cover of "Bad Side of the Moon" by Elton John and Bernie Taupin, also got much airplay on Canadian radio and was a minor hit in the U.S. Both tracks remain staples on classic rock radio stations in Canada. On Record was certified Gold in Canada and the band, along with Murphy, returned to the studio.

While the band was recording their third album, David and Ritchie Henman quit. Goodwyn and Clench held audition and the replacements were drummer Jerry Mercer (formerly of Mashmakhan) and guitarist Gary Moffet. They finished the album,  Electric Jewels, which the songs "Weeping Widow," "Just Like That" and "Lady Run, Lady Hide", which would stay in April Wine's set lists for many years. In support of this album, the band embarked on the Electric Adventure Tour where nearly every Canadian arena or concert hall that seated more than 2500 saw the band play. The tour also featured a massive lighting and pyrotechnic show. Touring proved successful; Gene Cornish and Dino Danelli of The Rascals attended a 1974 concert in Massey Hall, and were so impressed they offered to record and produce a live album of the band. The one-night recording session was something of a rushed enterprise; they wanted the album to be released by the end of the tour. Goodwyn wasn't happy with the sound, but April Wine Live went gold.

Gold and platinum years 
The band's fifth release, 1975's Stand Back, went double platinum in Canada, riding on the success of the singles "Tonight Is A Wonderful Time To Fall In Love" and "I Wouldn't Want To Lose Your Love". April Wine went on tour with Heart, then Thundermug. Following the tour, Jim Clench left to join Bachman–Turner Overdrive; he was replaced by Steve Lang.

The band's next release, in 1976, was The Whole World's Goin' Crazy. It was the first April Wine release to hit platinum status based on advanced sales orders alone. The album contained the popular title track as well as a hit single, the ballad "Like A Lover, Like A Song". Their sixth album, Forever for Now, was another platinum seller and contained the band's biggest single to date, "You Won't Dance With Me".

On March 4 & 5, 1977, April Wine was booked to play a charity concert at Toronto's famed El Mocambo Club. The co-headliner on the bill was a band called "The Cockroaches", which turned out to be The Rolling Stones. The pseudonym was a poorly kept secret and huge crowds turned out for the event. April Wine's performance was captured and released as the album Live at the El Mocambo. The band then got its first chance at touring the U.S., opening for The Rolling Stones, Styx and Rush.

Also in 1977, Brian Greenway, late of The Dudes (the Henmans' new band) was brought in as a third guitarist and co-vocalist. His addition gave April Wine a powerful three guitar attack that would make their hard rock sound. This also allowed Goodwyn to switch to keyboards for ballads. They also signed to Capitol Records (in addition to Aquarius).

1978 saw continued Canadian success, and the beginning of international success. The band's seventh album, and the first with Capitol, was First Glance, which had an immediate impact and the singles "Let Yourself Go" and "Get Ready For Love" were successful on Canadian radio. It was the third single, the raucous "Roller", that brought the band mass appeal across North America—it stayed on the Billboard Hot 100 for eleven weeks. First Glance stayed on the Billboard album chart for many weeks, making it April Wine's first gold record outside of Canada. Constant touring helped propel the band to greater success, as Americans embraced the hard rock of this "new" band from Canada—in 1978, they toured with Rush and played with Triumph, Starcastle, and Teaze and, in July, played a concert with the Rolling Stones, Journey, and the Atlanta Rhythm Section.

Following on the popularity of First Glance, April Wine released Harder ... Faster in 1979.  "Say Hello" and "I Like to Rock" were popular hits on both sides of the border and Harder ... Faster proved to be yet another multi-platinum release for the band. It would stay on the Billboard top album chart for 40 weeks. 1979 was spent touring with Styx, Rush, Toto, Boston, Squeeze and Blue Öyster Cult. By now, the band had accumulated enough hits that Aquarius was able to release the album Greatest Hits. In 1979, the BBC released In Concert for international distribution; in 1981, Aquarius released another compilation album, The Best of April Wine Rock Ballads.

1980s 
The Nature of the Beast was released in January 1981, and riding on the popularity of the hit singles "Just Between You and Me" and the band's cover of the Lorence Hud song "Sign of the Gypsy Queen", the album hit multi-platinum success in Canada, and was the first April Wine album to reach platinum status internationally. April Wine embarked on an extensive support tour, performing to their largest crowds ever. In addition to a packed schedule of solo concerts, they toured with Diamond Head, Harlequin, Krokus and Franke and the Knockouts, played five concerts with Loverboy, and travelled to Germany to play a concert with Neil Young, Jethro Tull, the Michael Schenker Group (MSG), and King Crimson. The band then went on an eighteen-month hiatus.

In July 1982, April Wine released their tenth studio album, Power Play. The album included the singles "Enough is Enough", "If You See Kay" and "Anything You Want, You Got It". The latter would become the band's opening number on the supporting tour, while the "Enough is Enough" video started receiving frequent rotation on MTV. Despite decent sales, Power Play was not met with the same critical acclaim the prior two albums had received; both the album and its singles charted well on Billboard's lists, but for shorter periods of time than earlier albums and singles. Still, it was certified gold, and then platinum, in October. The Power Play tour in 1982 was the band's most extensive—three months, with Saga, Eddie Money and Uriah Heep. The New York concerts with Saga and Money resulted in separate Live From Central Park albums.

The band started writing and recording their next album, Animal Grace, but the members were not getting along, and Myles Goodwyn moved from Canada to the Bahamas. Both Animal Grace and its single "This Could be the Right One" rose quickly on the charts, but stayed only for a short time. In 1984 the band got together for its announced "Farewell Tour", which was a month-long tour across Canada.
The tour was successful enough to spawn another live album, One for the Road.

April Wine still owed Capitol Records one more album. Greenway joined Goodwyn in Nassau, along with Montreal session musicians Daniel Barbe (keyboards), Jean Pellerin (bass), and drummer Marty Simon, to record what was supposed to be the band's final album, Walking Through Fire. It was released in September 1985 under the April Wine name.

Rebirth 

In 1988 Goodwyn moved back to Canada. Although there was interest in an April Wine reunion, and the subject was discussed among the former members, other commitments prevented them from getting together until 1992. April Wine returned to the stage that year, starting with a free concert in Portage la Prairie, Manitoba. The reunited band consisted of Goodwyn, Greenway, returning drummer Jerry Mercer and bassist Jim Clench, who hadn't played with the band since 1975. Filling out the act was third guitarist Steve Segal. The band toured in both Canada and the US. In 1993, now with Flood Ross Entertainment, they released the first "true" April Wine album in a decade, Attitude. It was certified gold in Canada soon after its release. Segal remained with the band through one more studio release, 1994's Frigate. Each year, for the next five years, they went out on tour, playing with, among others, Def Leppard, Foreigner, Meat Loaf, Lover Boy, Peter Frampton, Blue Öyster Cult and Nazareth.

The band released another album in 2001, entitled Back to the Mansion. Also in 2001, the band's song "Roller" was featured in the movie Joe Dirt. Then in 2003, they released the live album called Greatest Hits Live 2003. In the meantime, various labels released several compilation albums.

In 2004 Silverline released April Wine's first DVD-A called From the Front Row ... Live!. From 2001 to 2004 their live shows included Carl Dixon (formerly of the bands Coney Hatch, and The Guess Who) on guitars, keyboards and backing vocals.

April Wine entered into its 37th year as a band in 2006. On October 31 of that year, Aquarius Records released April Wine Rocks!, a new compilation of April Wine favourites, including a bonus live tune and a new album, entitled Roughly Speaking, was released on November 28, 2006. At the end of that year, Clench left the band for the second time and was replaced by bassist Breen LeBoeuf. A year later, Mercer announced his retirement; his scheduled final show in Calgary, Alberta, ringing in the 2009 new year, was cancelled due to bad weather. Mercer was replaced by drummer Blair Mackay.

April Wine was inducted into the Canadian Music Hall of Fame at the Juno Awards of 2010 in St. John's, Newfoundland and Labrador.  Goodwyn and Greenway accepted the honour.

On November 3, 2010, Jim Clench died in Montreal, of lung cancer, at 61. LeBoeuf left April Wine the following July and was replaced by Richard Lanthier from the Yes tribute band Close to the Edge.  Mackay left in March 2012 and was succeeded by Roy "Nip" Nichol, late of the band SamHill. Steve Lang died on February 4, 2017, at age 67, of Parkinson's disease.

Labels continue to release their music; BGO Records released a re-mastered The Nature Of The Beast / Power Play in 2020.  April Wine continues to tour across Canada annually and also plays festivals in Europe and in the United States, with the group now consisting of Goodwyn, Greenway, Lanthier, and drummer Roy "Nip" Nichol. They played their most recent concert, in Ottawa, in September 2021.

Their song 'Sign of the Gypsy Queen' can be heard in the background in the penultimate Breaking Bad episode Granite State; the guitar solo is playing behind Jesse's recorded confession tape being watched by Todd and Uncle Jack in the neo nazi compound.

In December 2022, Myles Goodwyn announced that he will no longer be touring with the band, turning over his vocal and guitar duties to Marc Parent: "I've had a long career, happy, fulfilling. I've seen much of the world and I'm grateful to continuing support of radio and our fans worldwide, but touring has been very difficult in recent years because of my diabetes and my health comes first, so unfortunately, my touring days are officially over", he said. He will only focus on writing and recording.

Discography 

Studio albums
 April Wine (1971), Aquarius Records
 On Record (1972), Aquarius Records
 Electric Jewels (1973), Aquarius Records
 Stand Back (1975), Aquarius Records
 The Whole World's Goin' Crazy (1976), Aquarius Records
 Forever for Now (1977), Aquarius Records
 First Glance (1978), Aquarius Records
 Harder ... Faster (1979), Aquarius Records
 The Nature of the Beast (1981), Aquarius Records, Capitol Records
 Power Play (1982), Aquarius Records, Capitol Records
 Animal Grace (1984), Capitol Records
 Walking Through Fire (1986), Aquarius Records, Capitol Records
 Attitude (1993), Flood Ross Entertainment
 Frigate (1994), Flood Ross Entertainment
 Back to the Mansion (2001), Civilian Records
 Roughly Speaking (2006), Universal Music Canada

Live albums
 April Wine Live (1974), Aquarius Records
 Live at the El Mocambo (1977), Aquarius Records
 In Concert (1980), BBC Transcription Services
 Live in London, on VHS (1981), Picture Music
 Live From Central Park, split with Saga (1982), Telemedia Communications, TBS Syndications
 Live From Central Park, split with Eddie Money (1982), Telemedia Communications
 One For The Road (1985), Aquarius Records
 From the Front Row ... Live! (2004), Silverline
 Live in London (2009), Cherry Red Records

Compilations
 Greatest Hits (1979), Aquarius Records
 The Best of April Wine Rock Ballads (1981), Aquarius Records
 King Biscuit Flower Hour, split with Michael Stanley Band (1981), DIR Broadcasting
 King Biscuit Flower Hour, split with John Waite (1983), DIR Broadcasting
 All the Rockers (1987), Aquarius Records
 The Hits (1987), Aquarius Records
 The First Decade (1989), Aquarius Records
 Oowatanite (1990), Aquarius Records
 Rock Ballads (1990), Aquarius Records
 The April Wine Collection (1991), Aquarius Records
 Champions of Rock (1996), Disky
 Back to Back Hits split with Great White (1996), CEMA Special Markets 
 King Biscuit Flower Hour Presents...April Wine (1999), DIR Broadcasting
 Rock Champions (2000), EMI
 Classic Masters (2002), Capitol Records
 Best of April Wine (2003), Aquarius Records
 Greatest Hits Live 2003 (2003), Civilian Records
 April Wine Rocks! (2006), Aquarius Records
 Animal Grace / Walking Through Fire (2009), BGO Records
 First Glance / Harder... Faster (2007), BGO Records
 The Hard & Heavy Collection (2009), Micro Werks
 The Best of April Wine Rock Ballads (2009), Aquarius Records
 The Nature of the Beast / Power Play (2012), BGO Records (re-released 2020)
 Classic Album Set (2016), Caroline Records

EPs
 I Like to Rock (1979), Capitol Records
 Like A Lover Like A Song (1979), Aquarius Records
 The Emergence of a Rock Powerhouse (1981), Capitol Records
 81 Summer Tour Tracks Pack, Recorded Live At Hammersmith Odeon London (1981), Capitol Records
 Review Preview (1981), Capitol Records
 Love Has Remembered Me (1985), Aquarius Records
 April Wine 4-track video (1985), Sony, Picture Music
 April Wine'' (1992), Flood Ross EntertainmentSingles "Fast Train" / "Wench" (1971), Aquarius Records
 "Listen Mister" / "Time" (1971), Aquarius Records
 "You Could Have Been a Lady" / "Teacher" (1972), Aquarius Records
 "Bad Side of the Moon" / "Believe in Me" (1972), Aquarius Records
 "Drop Your Guns" / "Flow River Flow" (1972), Aquarius Records
 "Weeping Widow" / "Tell Your Mama" (1973), Aquarius Records, Pye Records
 "Weeping Widow" / "Just Like That" (1973), Pye Records, Big Tree Records
 "Lady Run, Lady Hide" / "I Get Bad" (1973), Aquarius Records
 "Bad Side of the Moon" / "You Could Have Been a Lady" (1973), One Way Records
 "Just Like That" / "Cat's Claw" (1973), Aquarius Records
 "Electric Jewels" / "I Can Hear You Callin'" (1973), Aquarius Records
 "I'm On Fire For You Baby" (1974), Big Tree Records
 "Oowatanite" / "Highway Hard Run" (1975), Aquarius Records
 "Tonite Is A Wonderful Time To Fall In Love" / "Not For You Not For Rock & Roll" (1975), Aquarius Records
 "I Wouldn't Want To Lose Your Love" / "Druthers" (1975), Aquarius Records
 "Cum Hear The Band" / "Baby Done Got Some Soul" (1975), Aquarius Records
 "Child's Garden" / "The Whole World's Goin' Crazy" (1976), London Recordings
 "Rock 'N' Roll Woman" / "Child's Garden" (1976), London Recordings
 "Gimmie Love" / "We Can Be More Than We Are" (1976), Aquarius Records
 "You Won't Dance With Me / "Holly Would" (1976), Aquarius Records
 "Shotdown" (1976), London Recordings
 "Forever, For Now" (1976), Aquarius Records
 "The Whole World's Goin' Crazy" / "So Bad" (1976), Aquarius Records
 "Like A Lover, Like A Song" / "Goody Two-Shoes" (1976), Aquarius Records
 "She's No Angel" / "Gimme Love" (1977), Aquarius Records
 "Rock N' Roll Is A Vicious Game" (1977), London Recordings
 "Get Ready For Love" / "Comin' Right Down On Top Of Me" (1978), Capitol Records, Aquarius Records
 "Roller" / "Right Down To It" (1978), Capitol Records
 "Let Yourself Go" / "Hot On The Wheels Of Love" (1978), Aquarius Records
 "Tonite" / "Ladies Man" (1979), Capitol Records
 "Say Hello" / "Before the Dawn" (1979), Capitol Records
 ""Ladies Man" / "Oowatanite (live)" (1979), Capitol Records
 "I Like to Rock" / "Babes in Arms" (1979), Aquarius Records 
 "All Over Town" / "All Over Town (live)" (1981), Aquarius Records
 "Sign of the Gypsy Queen" / "Crash and Burn" (1981), Aquarius Records, Capitol Records
 "Just Between You And Me" / "Big City Girls" (1981), Aquarius Records
 "Roller" / "Say Hello" (1981), Capitol Records, Starline
 "If You See Kay" / "Blood Money" (1982), Capitol Records 
 "Enough is Enough" / "Ain't Got Your Love" (1982), Capitol Records, EMI Electrola
 "Tell Me Why" / "If You See Kay" (1982), Aquarius Records
 "What if We Fall in Love" / "Waiting on a Miracle" (1982), Aquarius Records
 "Sons of the Pioneers" / "Too Hot To Handle" (1984), Aquarius Records
 "This Could Be The Right One" / "I Really Don't Want Your Love" (1984), Aquarius Records
 "Money Talks" (1984), Aquarius Records
 "Rock Myself To Sleep" / "All It Will Ever Be" (1985), Capitol Records
 "Love Has Remembered Me" / "Anejo" (1985), Aquarius Records
 "It's A Pleasure To See You Again" / "Baby It's You" (1989), Aquarius Records
 "Here's Looking At You Kid" (1993), Flood Ross Entertainment
 "Good From Far (Far From Good)" (1993), Flood Ross Entertainment
 "Givin' It, Takin' It" (1993), Flood Ross Entertainment 
 "If You Believe in Me" (1993), Flood Ross Entertainment 
 "Voice In My Heart" (1993), Flood Ross Entertainment 
 "That's Love" (1993), Flood Ross Entertainment 
 "Can't Take Another Night" (1994), EMI
 "If I Was A Stranger" (1994), EMI
 "Drivin' With My Eyes Closed" (1994), Flood Ross Entertainment
 "I'm a Man" (1994), Flood Ross Entertainment
 "Won't Walk That Road No More" (1998), Civilian Records
 "Won't Go There" (2001), Civilian Records
 "Holiday" (2001), Civilian Records
 "Talk To Me" (2001), Civilian Records
 "That's Who I Am, This Is What I Do" / "Enough is Enough" (2003), Civilian Records
 "Strong Silent Type" / "Just Between You And Me (live)" (2003), Civilian Records

 Band members Current members Myles Goodwyn – lead vocals, guitar, keyboards (1969–1986, 1992–present) (retired from touring 2023)
 Brian Greenway – guitar, vocals (1977–1986, 1992–present)
 Richard Lanthier – bass, vocals (2011–present)
 Roy Nichol – drums, vocals (2012–present)
 Marc Parent – lead vocals, guitar (2023–present) (replaces Myles Goodwin for touring)Former members Jimmy Henman – vocals, bass (1969–1971)
 David Henman – guitar, vocals (1969–1973)
 Ritchie Henman – drums, keyboards (1969–1973)
 Jim Clench – bass, vocals (1971–1975, 1992–2006; died 2010)
 Gary Moffet – guitar, backing vocals (1973–1984)
 Jerry Mercer – drums (1973–1984, 1992–2008)
 Steve Lang – bass, backing vocals (1975–1984; died 2017)
 Daniel Barbe – keyboards (1985–1986)
 Jean Pellerin – bass (1985–1986)
 Marty Simon – drums (1985–1986)
 Steve Segal – guitar (1992–1994)
 Carl Dixon – guitar, keyboards, vocals (2001–2004)
 Breen LeBoeuf – bass, vocals (2007–2011)
 Blair Mackay – drums (2009–2012)Timeline'''

Awards 
April Wine has never won a Juno despite 11 nominations.

Myles Goodwyn was awarded the East Coast Music Awards ECMA Lifetime Achievement Award in 2003.

April Wine was also inducted into the Canadian Music Industry Hall of Fame and awarded with its Lifetime Achievement Award on March 13, 2009.

In 2008, April Wine was inducted into the East Coast Music Hall of Fame.  On April 18, 2010, they were inducted into the Canadian Music Hall of Fame.

See also 
 Canadian rock
 Music of Canada
 List of bands from Canada

References

External links 

 
 April Wine at CanadianBands.com
 April Wine at VH1.com
 
 

 
1969 establishments in Nova Scotia
Musical groups established in 1969
Musical groups disestablished in 1986
Musical groups reestablished in 1992
Musical groups from Halifax, Nova Scotia
Musical groups from Montreal
Canadian hard rock musical groups
English-language musical groups from Quebec
Anglophone Quebec people
Aquarius Records (Canada) artists
Bell Records artists
Canadian Music Hall of Fame inductees
Musical quintets
Big Tree Records artists
Cherry Red Records artists
MCA Records artists